Montcellia is an extinct genus of nectridean lepospondyl within the family Urocordylidae that lived in the late Carboniferous period in the modern France.

See also
 Prehistoric amphibian
 List of prehistoric amphibians

References 
Carroll, R. L. et al. (1998) Encyclopedia of Paleoherpetology Part 1. München:Pfeil.
Dutuit, J-M. & Heyler, D. (1994) Rhacitomes, Lepospondyles et Reptiles du Stephanien (Carbonifere superieur) du basin de Montceau-les-Mines (Massif central, France): In: quand le Massif Central etait sout l’equateur: un ecosystemse Carbonfiere a Montceau-les-Mines. Memoires de la section des Sciences 12:249-266.
Steyer J.-S. et al. (1998) Les Amphibiens de Paléozoique et du Trias français: historique et inventaire. Bulletin de la Société d'Histoire naturelle d'Autun 162:23-40. .

Carboniferous amphibians of Europe
Holospondyls